"Revolving Doors" is a double A-side single with "Amarillo" released by British virtual band Gorillaz from their fourth studio project, The Fall.

Background
"Revolving Doors" was recorded in Boston, Massachusetts on 5 October 2010, during the North American leg of the band's Escape to Plastic Beach World Tour. During an interview on 5th Pirate Radio, fictional band member 2-D said of the song: "I wrote the song after I saw a set of revolving doors in a hotel. It reminded me of how far from home I was and how much I was out of place."

"Revolving Doors" was first performed live at the Leader Bank Pavilion in Boston, Massachusetts during the Humanz Tour on 12 July 2017, almost 7 years after its initial release. The performance marked the first time material from The Fall was played live.

Personnel
Damon Albarn – vocals, synthesizers
Seye Adelekan – ukulele
Stephen Sedgwick – mixing engineer, recording engineer
Geoff Pesche – mastering engineer

Charts

Critical reception
NME gave the single a positive review, stating: "Revolving Doors is very unlike anything Gorillaz have ever done before. As Damon's vocals introduce a fragile human touch to proceedings, Gorillaz' leader spins this lament over gentle guitars and hypnotic chants."

References

2011 singles
Gorillaz songs
Songs written by Damon Albarn
2010 songs
Parlophone singles